Waldock is a surname. Notable people with the surname include:

Frederic Waldock (1898–1959), first-class cricketer
Humphrey Waldock (1904–1981), British jurist and international lawyer
Reece Waldock, Australian public servant
Ronnie Waldock (born 1932), English former professional association football player
Ray Waldock (born 1975). Designer and Angler

See also
Waldo (disambiguation)